Redefine is the third full-length album by Canadian hip hop duo Dragon Fli Empire, released in North America on Makebelieve Records in early 2009. Teekay has explained the album title by saying: "We 'redefine' by using our creativity to bust free from any boxes placed on what we can accomplish."

It features collaborations with a number of high-profile artists including Cadence Weapon, Masta Ace, Ohmega Watts, Josh Martinez, Moka Only and Raashan Ahmad and managed to reach number one for two weeks on the !earshot and Chart Attack hip hop charts, plus number three for several weeks on the U.S.-based CMJ hip hop charts. The album was also nominated for Best Rap / Hip Hop Recording at the 2009 Western Canadian Music Awards.

Music videos
A video for "Outside Inn" (featuring Cadence Weapon) was directed by Ramin Eshraghi-Yazdi and released in late 2008. It became the group's first music video to receive airplay on MuchMusic and MuchVibe. In 2009, two more videos directed by Wal Martian (for "Keep the Funk Alive" and "Paradise feat. Moka Only") were released exclusively online.

Track listing

References

2009 albums
Dragon Fli Empire albums